Petah Tikva includes more than 33 neighborhoods. These include:
 Ahim Israelit (אחים ישראלית)
 Amishav (עמישב)
 Bar Yehuda (בר יהודה)
 Bat Ganim (בת גנים)
 Beilinson (בלינסון)
 City Center (מרכז העיר)
 Ein Ganim (עין גנים)
 Hadar Ganim (הדר גנים)
 Hadar HaMoshavot (הדר המושבות)
 Kfar Avraham (כפר אברהם)
 Kfar Ganim (כפר גנים)
 Kiryat David Elazar (קרית דוד אליעזר)
 Kiryat Alon (known previously as Fajja and Neve Kibush) (קרית אלון)
 Kiryat Aryeh Industrial Zone (אזור תעשיה קרית אלון)
 Kiryat Eliezer Perry (קרית אליעזר פרי)
 Kiryat HaRav Solomon (קרית הרב סולומון)
 Kiryat Matalon (קרית מטלון)
 Krol (קרול)
 Mishkanot Ganim (משכנות גנים)
 Neve Gan (נוה גן)
 Neve Ganim (נוה גנים)
 Neve Oz (נוה עוז)
 New Neve Oz (נווה עוז החדשה)
 New Hadar HaMoshavot (הדר מושבות החדש)
 Ramat Siv Industrial Zone (אזור תעשיה רמת זיו)
 Ramat Verber (רמת ורבר)
 Sgula Industrial Zone (אזור תעשיה סגולה)
 Sha'ariya (שעריה)
 Shifer (שיפר)
 Shikun Ahdut (שיכון אחדות)
 Shikun HaPo'el HaMizrahi (שיכון הפועל המזרחי)
 Tkuma (תקומה)
 Tzameret Ganim (צמרת גנים)
 Yoseftal (יוספטל)

External links
Construction in Israel 2012, tables 64-65 (Hebrew)

Petah Tikva
Neighborhoods in Israel
Lists of neighbourhoods
Neighborhoods of Petah Tikva